Enrique Bátiz Campbell (born May 4, 1942) is a Mexican conductor and concert pianist.

Bátiz began piano studies at age 8 with Francisco Agea.  He continued studies 10 years later with György Sándor.  After two years at Southern Methodist University in Dallas, he became a student of Adele Marcus at the Juilliard School, where he also studied conducting.  In 1964, he made several national tours as a pianist, and in 1965 was a semifinalist in the Marguerite Long International Piano Competition in Paris.  From 1967 to 1970, he continued his piano studies in Poland with Zbigniew Drzewiecki, where he also studied orchestral conducting with Stanislaw Wislocki.  In 1970, he was a finalist in the Ferruccio Busoni International Piano Competition in Italy.

A 1967 concert tour featured performances with the Łodz and Szczecin Philharmonics.  He returned to Mexico in 1969.  His debut as a conductor was in the Palacio de Bellas Artes in 1969 with the Xalapa Symphony Orchestra.  In 1970, he made a series of piano recordings for the Polish and Salzburg Broadcast Companies.  In April 1971, he was named director, conductor, and founder of the State of Mexico Symphony Orchestra (OSEM).  He continued in the post until 1983.  He then was music director of the Mexico City Philharmonic Orchestra from 1983 to 1989.  Outside of Mexico, in 1984, Bátiz was named guest conductor of the Royal Philharmonic Orchestra.   In 1990, he resumed his directorship of the OSEM, remaining until 2017; Bátiz then stood down as music director, nominally for health reasons related to Parkinson's Disease.
He has recorded for such labels as EMI International, ASV Records, Musical Heritage Society, Naxos, Pickwick, and RPO Records.  He has made some 145 recordings: 58 with the State of Mexico Symphony, 41 with the Royal Philharmonic, 19 with the Mexico City Philharmonic, 12 with the London Philharmonic, nine with the London Symphony, three with the Philharmonia, two with the Royal Liverpool Philharmonic, and one with the Orchestra della Toscana.  He has recorded the complete nine symphonies by Beethoven, the complete pieces for orchestra by Joaquin Rodrigo, Manuel M. Ponce, and Georges Bizet, and eight volumes of Mexican music.  In 1997, Bátiz and the OSEM recorded the six symphonies and other works of Tchaikovsky, the four Brahms symphonies and the four symphonies of Robert Schumann.

Throughout his career, Bátiz has received numerous awards.  These include La primera Presea Bienal in Art from the State of Mexico Confederation of Professionals, Rome’s International Gold Mercury award (the first given to a Latin American artist), and the Jose Marti and Tlatelolco’s Eagle medals.  In 1986, Brazil awarded him the Rio Branco medal for making the first digital recording of the nine Bachianas Brasileiras by Heitor Villa-Lobos.  The Mexican Union of Theatrical and Musical Broadcasters named him the most distinguished artist of the year four times (1971, 1981, 1983, and 1996).  In 1991, he received the Mozart medal given by the Domecq Cultural Institute.  In 1995, he won the “State of Mexico” Prize. In 1994, because of his contribution to the musical culture of the State of Mexico and the musical world, he received the Sor Juana Ines de la Cruz award for Arts and Letters. In recognition of his achievements, he has been declared Mexiquense Destacado, or “Outstanding Mexican.”

External links
 IUMA Management page on Enrique Bátiz

Mexican conductors (music)
Male conductors (music)
1942 births
Living people
Mexican classical pianists
Male classical pianists
Mexican people of Irish descent
21st-century conductors (music)
21st-century classical pianists
21st-century male musicians